Champagne Lanson is a Champagne producer that is based in Reims in the Champagne region. Since 2006, it has been owned by the Lanson-BCC group that is headed by Bruno Paillard (who also owns the Bruno Paillard champagne house).

History
Lanson was founded in 1760 by a magistrate, François Delamotte. He was succeeded by his son Nicholas-Louis in 1798 and formed a partnership with Jean-Baptiste Lanson, who gave the company the name of Lanson et Cie in 1837. The company focused, as it still does today, on exporting champagne to foreign markets.

By the late 19th century, Lanson was supplying champagne by royal appointment to the courts of the United Kingdom, Sweden and Spain. Lanson remains a purveyor of champagne to the British royal family and retains the Royal warrant of appointment (United Kingdom) which currently depicts the coat of arms of Elizabeth II on its bottles.

The champagne house remained family owned until 1980, when it was sold by Etitenne and Pierre Lanson to the Gardinier Group. It changed hands several times until 1994, when it was purchased by Marne et Champagne (which renamed itself Lanson International).

In 1996, Lanson International was purchased by the Boizel-Chanoine Group (BCC). Lanson and Besserat de Bellefon became part of this group, which also includes Phillipponnat, de Venoge, Chanoine, Boizel and Alexandre Bonnet. The Boizel-Chanoine Group also make "private label" champagne for several UK supermarkets and independent retailers. In 2006, the Lanson-BCC group was created.

In 2008, a major repackaging exercise took place. The new packaging is reminiscent of the Lanson House Style of the 1980s.

Range of wines

Core Range
Le Black Label Brut: 50% Pinot Noir, 35% Chardonnay and 15% Pinot Meunier
Le Rosé: 53% Pinot Noir, 32% Chardonnay and 15% Pinot Meunier
Le White Label Sec: 50% Pinot Noir, 35% Chardonnay and 15% Pinot Meunier
Le Blanc de Blancs: 100% Chardonnay
Le Black Réserve: 50% Pinot Noir, 35% Chardonnay, 15% Pinot Meunier

Rare and exceptional
Le Green Label Organic: 50% Pinot Noir, 20% Chardonnay, 30% Pinot Meunier
Le Clos Lanson: 100% Chardonnay
Le Vintage 2009: 52% Pinot Noir, 48% Chardonnay

Prestige cuvées
La Noble Cuvée Brut 2002: 70% Chardonnay, 30% Pinot Noir
La Noble Cuvée Blanc de Blancs 2002: 100% Chardonnay

See also
 Champagne Besserat de Bellefon
 List of Champagne houses

References

External links

Champagne Besserat de Bellefon

Drink companies of France
Champagne producers
French companies established in 1760
Food and drink companies established in 1760